Bitter Sweet is the debut extended play by Nigerian singer-songwriter Majeeed. It was released on 25 March 2022 by Dream Empire Music, through Dvpper Music. Bitter Sweet is built around the early life of a Nigerian teen, transiting into an early adult. The album is a mixture of Afrofusion, and Afropop, with R&B, and Soul percussive rhythms. It was produced primarily by Majeeed, along with production from Dalor Beats, Poposky Beats, Shugavybz, BlaiseBeatz, and Mr Kleb. The EP received favorable reviews from critics. 

Lyrically, Bitter Sweet communicate, with elements that associate with love, and romance, including unrequited love, toxic affair, and adulthood pressure. Its lead singles include, "Time" released in 2021, and produced by Majeeed, and "Yawa No Dey End" released in 2022, and produced by Shugabeatz. The song was later supported with a new version with Joeboy, which peaked at number 41, on Nigeria TurnTable Top 50 chart. On 26 March 2022, the extended play peaked at number 8, on Nigeria Apple Music Top Album chart.

Background
On 19 February 2021, Majeeed released "Time", a song he produced at Harrysong house. 6 months after, he secured a record deal with Dream Empire Music in August, and began working on his debut ep. On 25 February 2022, he released "Yawa No Dey End", a song produced by Shugabeatz. With an accompanying music video directed by Kemz. He tells BellaNaija that "he makes music that heals and tells stories that give a connection to nature, on how to feel and how the world really works." He further tells Chinonso Ihekire, a music editor for the Guardian Life Magazine, that "it is a true-life story. It is my reality and the same with most people. Bittersweet is more than just a project to me; it is a compilation of all my relationship problems."

Composition
The EP opening track "How I Care" describes his feelings, and tells us how he feels about her. In "No Room For Love", Majeeed has fallen for a girl and tells her to be plain with her feelings towards him, besides being found in a toxic romance, she also doesn’t seem to understand him and his circumstances fully.  With a voice sample that reads (“one simple bag for a baby girl”) and Majeeed replies (“a baby girl needs love”). In "Yawa No Dey End ", the project lead single boasts all of Majeeed’s trademark. He casually sings about what might kill him, like his responsibilities as a provider in a struggling economy, and his mother’s financial needs. In "Tough Love" you can see how he processes his partner’s behavior and seeks an effortless type of Love. Between "Smile For Me", and "Time", with the help of his lady before the record fades. Majeeed, we know you’re trying to hold on, and dealing with a woman who doesn’t feel like she’s getting what she deserves isn’t always easy.

Other releases
On 13 May 2020, Majeeed released a new version of "Yawa No Dey End" with Joeboy, through emPawa Africa for Dream Empire Music. It peaked at number 41, on Nigeria TurnTable Top 50. Its accompanying music video directed by Kemz, and was released on 29 April 2022. "Yawa No Dey End" was shortlisted on The Native's songs of the day, on 29 April 2022.  Chibuzo Emmanuel, who reviewed the song for the list, praised the song, and said "Yawa No Dey End is a beautiful mid-tempo highlife-inf lected Afropop record".

Track listing

Personnel
Ekeh Chiaka Joseph - Primary artist, writer, production (track 6)
Dalor Beats - Production (tracks 1)
Poposky Beats - Production (tracks 2)
Shugavybz - Production (tracks 3)
Mr Kleb - Production (tracks 4)
BlaiseBeatz - Production (tracks 5)

Release history

References 

2022 debut EPs
Rhythm and blues EPs
Afro pop music albums